Iceton is a surname. Notable people with the surname include:

Jake Iceton (1903–1981), English footballer
Lloyd Iceton (1920–1994), English footballer
Thomas Iceton (1849–1908), Australian cricketer
Steven Iceton (1982–), Photographer